Cauliflory is a botanical term referring to plants that flower and fruit from their main stems or woody trunks, rather than from new growth and shoots. There have been several strategies to distinguish among types of cauliflory historically, including the location or age of branch where inflorescences grow, whether inflorescences attach to stolons or branches, and whether axillary nodes or adventitious nodes develop into reproductive tissues. Cauliflory is a non-homologous phenomenon with several different sources of development and evolutionary value.

The development of buds in axillary cauliflorous species occurs through either the re-use of the same position or old tissue over seasons of growth or release from dormancy. In both cases, vascularization of the bud must occur from pre-existing tissue, such as the pith. In Cercis canadensis, dormant buds break annually in a sympodial pattern. If flowers develop adventitiously, they form similarly to epicormic tissues and may be reactive to immediate environmental conditions. In certain species of Ficus, flowers may be produced from axillary buds in young plants and change to adventitious buds later.

One frequently suggested hypothesis for the evolution of cauliflory is to allow trees to be pollinated or have their seeds dispersed by animals, especially bats, that climb on trunks and sturdy limbs to feed on the nectar and fruits. Some species may instead have fruit which drops from the canopy and ripen only after they reach the ground, an alternative strategy termed nonfunctionally caulicarpic fruits. In Ficus, there is not an association between the evolution of cauliflory as an apomorphy and ecological associations. Alternative hypotheses have focused on competition for sugar and minerals between flowers and young leaves, mechanical support for larger flowers and fruits particularly in Atrocarpus and Durio, and evolutionary theory built on the plant as a metapopulation and differential rates of mutations across large plant bodies.

Families, genera and (some) species
(list incomplete)
Moraceae
Ficus: F. racemosa (cluster fig), F. sansibarica (knobby fig), F. sur (Cape fig), F. sycomorus (sycamore fig)
Artocarpus: A. heterophyllus (jackfruit), A. integer (chempedak), A. altilis (breadfruit)
Myrtaceae
Syzygium: S. moorei, S. cormiflorum
Plinia: P. cauliflora
Malvaceae
Theobroma: T. cacao (cacao), T. grandiflorum (cupuaçu) (and possibly others)
Cola: C. mossambicensis (and possibly others)
Crescentia: C. cujete (calabash tree).
Pavonia: P. strictiflora
Durio
Fabaceae
Cercis: C. siliquastrum
Castanospermum: C. australe, Angylocalyx
Cynometra cauliflora, Macrolobium, Clitoria
Surianaceae
Recchia simplicifolia
Meliaceae
Dysoxylum spp. including D. parasiticum (ramiflorous) and D.spectabile
Sapindaceae
Pancovia: P. golungensis (false soap-berry)
Chytranthus
Caricaceae
Carica papaya (papaya)
 Putranjivaceae
Drypetes natalensis (Natal ironplum) (and possibly others)
Sapotaceae
Englerophytum magalismontanum (stamvrug)
Omphalocarpum
Stilbaceae
Halleria lucida (tree fuchsia)
Annonaceae
Uvariopsis (all species are ramiflorous, cauliflorous or both.) Cauliflorous species are: U. submontana. U. sessiflora, U. congolana, U. guineensis, U. vanderystii,  U. noldeae, U. doica, U. letestui,  U. bakeriana,  U. solheidii,
Polyalthia cauliflora
Piptostigma
Annonidium mannii
 Oxalidaceae
Averrhoa bilimbi (bilimbi)
Cunoniaceae
Davidsonia
Lecythidaceae
Couroupita guianensis (cannonball tree)
Gustavia, Grias, Couroupita
Thymelaeaceae
Phaleria clerodendron (scented daphne)
Bignoniaceae
Adenocalymma
Amphitecna, Parmentiera, Crescentia
Rhodocolea, Ophiocolea, Colea
Ebenaceae
Diospyros
Aristolochiaceae
Aristolochia arborea

Image gallery

See also 
 Ramiflory
 Spur
 Adventitious buds

References

External links

Cauliflory in Malaysian Rainforest Trees

 
Plant morphology